Joseph W. Handley, Jr. (2008–present) is the president of Asian Access, a non-profit evangelical organization dedicated to the development of leaders of the Church throughout Asia originally established in 1967. He has been the president since 2008, leading movements including developing an award-winning partnership with SIM USA and prompting the mission to invest in several natural disasters that most notably helped the people of Japan and Nepal. Under his guidance, Asian Access started both A2.business and the Pan Asia Leader Development program as well as partnered in the development of the Nozomi Project in Japan. Previously, he was the founding director of Azusa Pacific University's Office of World Mission and lead mission pastor at Rolling Hills Covenant Church.

Education
Handley received a B.A. in psychology and an M.A. in theology from Azusa Pacific University in 1992. As of 2020, he received his Ph.D. in Intercultural Studies at Fuller Theological Seminary.

Career
Handley served nine years at Azusa Pacific University where he founded the Office of World Missions and led the first multi-national high school mission congress to Mexico City in 1996. He transitioned to Rolling Hills Covenant Church in 1998 where he served as the Global Outreach Pastor and later the Associate Pastor for Outreach Ministries. He led relief efforts to Hurricane Katrina and expanded the church's ministry through Kazakhstan to focus on the Silk Road. He enhanced holistic forms of mission through broader investment in places like the Congo, South Africa, and other countries. During his tenure, Handley established over 100 missional partnerships and even moved his entire family to Istanbul, Turkey for one year to study church planting and leader development.

In July 2008, Joe became the fourth president of Asian Access, a leader development organization that began in 1967. He is credited with developing the award-winning partnership with SIM USA and leading the mission to invest in several natural disaster relief efforts in Japan and Nepal. In addition, Handley jumpstarted A2.business, the Pan Asia Leader Development program and helped launch the Nozomi Project. He is continuing the mission's vision to reach 20 countries by 2020. Currently the organization is partnered with 16 Asian countries.

Handley is a contributing blogger for the Billy Graham Center’s EvangelVision Blog. He is the senior advisor on the International Orality Network leadership team and serves on the advisory teams for ELEVATE, BiblicalTraining.org, and DualReach. He recently completed his Ph.D. in Intercultural Studies at Fuller Theological Seminary as of 2020. Handley is also frequently interviewed by Mission Network News to offer perspective on current events in Asia.

Honors
Missio Nexus eXcelerate Award: “Excellence in Mission” for communications.

Personal
Handley is a second-generation Christian pastor, following the footsteps of his father, Joe Handley Sr. He was born and raised in Rowland Heights, California. While attending Azusa Pacific University, he met his wife, Vasilka Demitroff Handley. They have three children, all born in California. Currently, Handley and his wife live in Japan to work closely with Asian Access as the mission expands. He recently completed his Ph.D. in intercultural studies at Fuller Theological Seminary.

References

Azusa Pacific University alumni
Fuller Theological Seminary alumni
Living people
American religious leaders
Year of birth missing (living people)